Heather Jean Simmons-Carrasco (born May 25, 1970) is an American competitor in synchronized swimming and Olympic champion. Born in Mountain View, California, she competed for the American team that received a gold medal in synchronized swimming at the 1996 Summer Olympics in Atlanta.

The Olympic team she was a part of that won gold consisted of Suzannah Bianco, Tammy Cleland, Becky Dyroen-Lancer, Emily LeSueur, Heather Pease, Jill Savery, Nathalie Schneyder, Jill Sudduth, and Margot Thien. The U.S. finished with a score of 99.720 points, and received nine perfect 10s from the judges for their performance. It was the first-ever Synchronized Swim Team event.

She attended West Valley College.

References

1970 births
Living people
American synchronized swimmers
Synchronized swimmers at the 1996 Summer Olympics
Olympic gold medalists for the United States in synchronized swimming
Olympic medalists in synchronized swimming
World Aquatics Championships medalists in synchronised swimming
Synchronized swimmers at the 1991 World Aquatics Championships
Medalists at the 1996 Summer Olympics